The Local Government Chronicle (LGC) is a British weekly magazine for local government officers, and is published by Metropolis. The magazine was launched in 1855 by bookseller and publisher Charles Knight . It was then published by Emap, now Metropolis. It is politically independent.

Coverage
Subjects LGC covers include finance, law, management, housing, planning, regeneration, the environment, education, big society, local elections, the third sector and social services. Sarah Calkin is its editor. It features contributions from analysts including Tony Travers from the London School of Economics, a weekly anonymous columnist "LGC Insider" and various governmental figures.

Elections
It provides comprehensive local election coverage each year, in the form of rolling online results, expert analysis from Professors Colin Rallings and Michael Thrasher from Plymouth University, political reaction and a council control map.

Events
Among its other activities, LGC runs the first national awards to be launched for local government, the LGC Awards for Excellence. It also launched the Business Partnership Awards, which reward private contractors who work with local authorities in the UK to deliver services; and a large number of public sector conferences.

The LGC Council of the Year has been:
 2019: Wigan Metropolitan Borough Council
 2018: Barking and Dagenham London Borough Council
 2017: Sevenoaks District Council

See also

 List of magazines in the United Kingdom

References

External links
 , the magazine's official website 
 , the magazine's subscription site

1855 establishments in England
Political magazines published in the United Kingdom
Weekly magazines published in the United Kingdom
Ascential
Local government in the United Kingdom
Magazines published in London
Magazines established in 1855
Professional and trade magazines